Kyla Alissa Pratt (born September 16, 1986) is an American actress. She provided the voice of Penny Proud in the first animated series for Disney Channel called The Proud Family, and Breanna Latrice Barnes in UPN's One on One. After playing the daughter of Eddie Murphy's character in the films Dr. Dolittle and Dr. Dolittle 2, Pratt became the main character in the remake series of the franchise which included Dr. Dolittle 3, Dr. Dolittle: Tail to the Chief, and Dr. Dolittle: Million Dollar Mutts. Pratt has also been in the films Fat Albert, Hotel for Dogs, and The Proud Family Movie. From 2012 to 2014, she appeared in the series Let's Stay Together. She is currently a part of VH1's Black Ink Crew: Compton and the cast of Call Me Kat on Fox and is reprising the role of Penny in The Proud Family revival The Proud Family: Louder and Prouder on Disney+.

Personal life
Kyla Alissa Pratt was born on September 16, 1986, to Kecia Pratt, an actress, and Johnny McCullar, a  basketball player. She is the oldest of five children.

Pratt began a relationship with Danny Kirkpatrick, a rapper, songwriter, and tattoo artist, in 2005. On November 17, 2010, the couple welcomed their daughter, Lyric Kirkpatrick. They became engaged in 2011 and welcomed another daughter, Liyah Kirkpatrick, on August 5, 2013. Pratt appears alongside Kirkpatrick on the reality show Black Ink Crew: Compton.

Career

Acting career
Pratt began acting at age eight, appearing in commercials for an interactive computer game and Nike. In 1997, she appeared in an episode of Walker, Texas Ranger titled "The Neighborhood", in which she portrayed Kyla Jarvis, a ten-year-old girl who miraculously recovers after accidentally being shot in a drive-by shooting in her gang-ridden neighborhood, and reveals that she saw heaven where she met a guardian angel who gives her an important mission from God. With Walker's help, Kyla Jarvis spreads the angel message of faith and love, uniting her local community into helping clean up their neighborhood and end the gang violence plaguing it. She appeared in an episode of Friends, followed by roles in Smart Guy, Sister, Sister, Family Matters, Lizzie McGuire, Moesha, and The Parkers.

In 2001, she won the role of Breanna Barnes in the UPN series One on One (2001–2006). During the run of One on One, Pratt also voiced Penny Proud, the lead character in the Disney Channel animated series The Proud Family. She later voiced the character for The Proud Family Movie in 2005. In addition to television roles, Pratt has appeared in several feature films, including Love & Basketball (2000) and Fat Albert (2004). She played Maya Dolittle in Dr. Dolittle (1998) and Dr. Dolittle 2 (2001), both of which starred Eddie Murphy, and reprised her role as Maya Dolittle (now the lead character) in the direct-to-DVD releases of Dr. Dolittle 3 (2006), Dr. Dolittle: Tail to the Chief (2008), and Dr. Dolittle: Million Dollar Mutts (2009).

In 2009, Kyla Pratt co-starred alongside Emma Roberts and Jake T. Austin in Hotel for Dogs. Pratt joined the cast of BET's Let's Stay Together in its second season. 
In February 2014, Pratt was voted #97 on VH1's 100 Greatest Child Stars. In June 2014, she starred alongside Jessica Sula in a Freeform pilot called Recovery Road based on Blake Nelson's novel of the same name. The show debuted on Freeform in January 2016, but was cancelled shortly afterwards, in May 2016.

Singing career
As a member of the Disney Channel Circle of Stars, Pratt performed a cover version of "Circle of Life" that appeared on the DisneyMania 2 album. She sang "It's All About Me", for the series soundtrack for The Proud Family,  and "A Dream Is a Wish Your Heart Makes" with the Disney Channel Stars. Kyla also sang in the 2019 Lifetime Christmas movie, "There's No Time Like Christmas."

Filmography

Film

Television

Music videos

References

External links
 

Alexander Hamilton High School (Los Angeles) alumni
American child actresses
American television actresses
American voice actresses
Living people
Actresses from Los Angeles
20th-century American actresses
21st-century American actresses
American film actresses
African-American actresses
1986 births
20th-century African-American women
21st-century African-American women
21st-century African-American people